Lowell E. and Paula G. Jackson House, also known as the House of Tile, is a historic home located at Long Beach, LaPorte County, Indiana.  It was designed by architect John Lloyd Wright and built in 1938.  The house is constructed of 12 inch square clay tiles painted green and carved into a sand dune on the shore of Lake Michigan.  The house has horizontal clapboard siding and is in the International Style of architecture. The house has three levels and a carport. Also contributing is the house site.

It was listed on the National Register of Historic Places in 2013.

References

Houses on the National Register of Historic Places in Indiana
International style architecture in Indiana
Houses completed in 1938
Houses in LaPorte County, Indiana
National Register of Historic Places in LaPorte County, Indiana